Hypotacha ochribasalis is a species of moth in the family Erebidae first described by George Hampson in 1896. It is found in Burkina Faso, Ethiopia, Ghana, Kenya, Mauritania, Oman, Saudi Arabia, Sudan, Tanzania, Yemen and Iraq.

References

Moths described in 1896
Hypotacha
Moths of Africa
Moths of Asia